Francesco Nicola Fago, 'II Tarantino'  (26 February 1677 – 18 February 1745) was an Italian Baroque composer and teacher. He was the father of Lorenzo Fago (1704-1793).

Biography

Born in Taranto, in the Apulia region, he studied music under Francesco Provenzale at the Conservatorio della Pietà dei Turchini in Naples between 1693 and 1695.

Between 1704 and 1708 he worked at the Conservatorio Sant'Onofrio, but from 1705 to 1740 he was based at the Conservatorio della Pietà dei Turchini, where his pupils included Leonardo Leo, Francesco Feo, Giuseppe de Majo, Niccolo Jommelli, Nicola Sala, Michele de Falco, Carmine Giordani as well as his own son, Lorenzo. 

From 1709 to 1731, Nicola Fago served at the Tesoro di San Gennaro. He died in Naples in 1745.

Operas
Lo Masiello
L'Astratto (1709)
Il Radamista (1707)
La Dafne
Cassandra Indovina (1711)
"Magnificat" ten vocals + instruments
"Stabat Mater" 4 vocals + a quartet
Il Faraone Sommerso (1709)

Other works
Le fenzejune abbendurate, Commedia per musica, 1710
La Cianna, Commedia per musica, 1711
Lo Masillo Dramma per musica (second act by Michele de Falco), 1712
La Dafne, Favola pastorale in stile arcadio, 1714

References

1677 births
1745 deaths
18th-century Italian male musicians
18th-century Italian composers
Italian Baroque composers
Italian male classical composers
People from Taranto